Rock Creek Cemetery is an  cemetery with a natural and rolling landscape located at Rock Creek Church Road, NW, and Webster Street, NW, off Hawaii Avenue, NE, in the Petworth neighborhood of Washington, D.C., United States. It is across the street from the historic Soldiers' Home and the Soldiers' Home Cemetery. It also is home to the InterFaith Conference of Metropolitan Washington. On August 12, 1977, Rock Creek Cemetery and the adjacent church grounds were listed on the National Register of Historic Places as Rock Creek Church Yard and Cemetery.

History
The cemetery was first established in 1719, under the British colony of the Province of Maryland, as a churchyard within the glebe of St. Paul's Episcopal Church, Rock Creek Parish. Later, the Vestry decided to expand the burial ground as a public cemetery to serve the city of Washington, D.C., which had acquired the cemetery, within its district boundaries as established in 1791, formerly, being a part of the state of Maryland, and formally established through an Act of Congress in 1840.

An expanded cemetery was landscaped in the rural garden style, to function as both a cemetery and a public park. It is a ministry of St. Paul's Episcopal Church, Rock Creek Parish, with sections for St. John's Russian Orthodox Church and St. Nicholas Orthodox Cathedral.

The park-like setting of Rock Creek Cemetery has many notable mausoleums, sculptures, and tombstones. The best known is the Adams Memorial, a contemplative, androgynous bronze sculpture seated before a block of granite that was created by Augustus Saint-Gaudens and Stanford White. It marks the graves of Marian Hooper 'Clover' Adams and her husband, Henry Adams, and sometimes, mistakenly, the sculpture is referred to as Grief.  Saint-Gaudens entitled it The Mystery of the Hereafter and The Peace of God that Passeth Understanding.

Other notable memorials include the Frederick Keep Monument, the Heurich Mausoleum, the Hitt Monument, the Hardon Monument, the Kauffman Monument that is known as The Seven Ages of Memory, the Sherwood Mausoleum Door, and the Thompson-Harding Monument.

Sculptors of works in the cemetery
 Gutzon Borglum, Rabboni-Ffoulke Memorial, 1909
 James Earle Fraser, Frederick Keep Monument, 1920
 Laura Gardin Fraser, Hitt Memorial,  1931
 William Ordway Partridge, Kauffmann Memorial, also known as Seven Ages or Memory, 1897
 Brenda Putnam, Simon Memorial, 1917
 Vinnie Ream, Edwin B. Hay Monument, 1906
 Augustus Saint-Gaudens, Adams Memorial, 1890
 Mary Washburn, Waite Memorial, 1909
 Adolph Alexander Weinman, Spencer Memorial, after 1919

Numerous fine works by unknown sculptors also exist in the cemetery.

Interments

A
 Cleveland Abbe (1838–1916), prominent meteorologist
 John James Abert (1788–1863), Chief of the Corps of Topographical Engineers
 Henry Adams (1838–1918),  writer, descendant of two U.S. presidents; grave is marked by the Adams Memorial
 Clover Hooper Adams (1843–1885), Washington hostess and accomplished amateur photographer, wife of Henry Adams; grave is marked by the Adams Memorial
 Alice Warfield Allen (1869–1929), mother of the Duchess of Windsor, Wallis Simpson
 Doug Allison (1846–1916),  baseball player
 Frank Crawford Armstrong (1835–1909), Confederate general
 Timothy P. Andrews (1794–1868), Union Army general and paymaster-general of the United States Army (1862–1864)
 James B. Aswell (1869–1931), educator and member of the House of Representatives from 1913 to 1931

B

 Abraham Baldwin (1754–1807), Yale graduate, U.S. Senator, attorney, signer of the U.S. Constitution, first president of the University of Georgia
 Cecil A. Beasley, Alabama State Senator.
 Melville Bell (1819–1905), Scottish teacher and inventor, father of Alexander Graham Bell, Hubbard Bell Grossman Pillot Memorial
 Eliza Grace Symonds Bell – wife of Melville Bell
 Joseph Bray Bennett (1833–1913), Wisconsin state senator and appointments clerk at the U.S. Department of Agriculture
 Andrew H. Berding, journalist and former Assistant Secretary of State for Public Affairs
 Emile Berliner (1851–1929), German-born American inventor of the gramophone
 Montgomery Blair (1813–1883), Lincoln's Postmaster General
 Ben H. Brown Jr. (1914–1989), former United States Ambassador to Liberia
 Robert C. Buchanan (1811–1878), military general during the American Civil War and the Mexican War

C
 Camille Chautemps (1885–1963), Prime Minister of France
 Edward Clark (1822–1902), Architect of the Capitol
 Catherine Cate Coblentz (1897–1951), writer, wife of William Coblentz
 William Coblentz (1873–1962), physicist, notable for pioneer contributions to infrared radiometry and spectroscopy

D
 S. Wallace Dempsey (1862–1949), Republican politician
 Hubert Dilger (1836–1911), American Civil War artillerist, captain in the Union Army, Medal of Honor recipient
 Gerald A. Drew (1903–1970) United States Ambassador to Haiti and Bolivia
 Amanda Ruter Dufour (1822–1899), poet

E
 Susan Ann Edson (1823–1897), personal physician to President James A. Garfield
 Matthew Gault Emery (1818–1901), mayor of Washington, D.C., from 1870 to 1871
 Henry Ellsworth Ewing (1883–1951), arachnologist

F
 Charles S. Fairfax (1829–1869), Virginia-born California politician who was entitled to the British title 10th Lord Fairfax of Cameron
 Stephen Johnson Field (1816–1899), Associate justice of US Supreme Court
 Peter Force (1790–1868),  politician, US Army lieutenant in the War of 1812, newspaper editor, archivist, and historian, who served as the twelfth mayor of Washington, D.C., and whose library of historical documents became the first major Americana collection of the Library of Congress
 Israel Moore Foster (1873–1950), Republican Representative in Congress
 James Edmund France (1906–1920), Brother of co-founder of NASCAR
 William H. French (1815–1881), major general during the American Civil War and the Mexican War

G

 Julius Garfinckel (1872–1936), merchant, founder of Washington department store, Garfinckel's
 Harry Post Godwin (1857–1900) Chief Editor of the National Republican, Washington Star
 Gilbert Hovey Grosvenor (1875–1966), president of the National Geographic Society, Hubbard Bell Grossman Pillot Memorial

H
 Mary Berri Chapman Hansbrough (1872–1951), poet and painter.
 John Marshall Harlan (1833–1911), Supreme Court associate justice, known as the "Great Dissenter;" he wrote the lone dissenting opinion in Plessy v. Ferguson
 Patricia Roberts Harris (1924–1985), Ambassador, first African-American woman to serve in a presidential cabinet
 George L. Harrison (1887–1958), banker, insurance executive, and political advisor during The Second World War
 Frank Hatton (1846–1894), U.S. Postmaster General and editor of the Washington Post
 Christian Heurich (1842–1945), German-born American founder of Heurich Brewery (1871–1954)
 Samuel Billingsley Hill (1875–1958), U.S. Representative from Washington and member of the United States Board of Tax Appeals (now the United States Tax Court)
 William Henry Holmes (1846–1933), known for scientific illustration of the American West, his role in controversy over the antiquity of humans in the Americas, and leadership at the Smithsonian Institution

J
 Charles Francis Jenkins (1867–1934), television and motion picture pioneer 
 Nelson T. Johnson (1887–1954), ambassador
 James Kimbrough Jones (1839–1908),  politician
 John Johnson (1842–1907), Medal of Honor recipient
 Opha May Johnson (1879–1955), 1st known female U.S. Marine (1918)

K

 Samuel H. Kauffmann (1829–1906) newspaper publisher
 Oliver Hudson Kelley (1826–1913), a founder of the Order of the Patrons of Husbandry (The Grange) 
 Angela Jurdak Khoury (1915–2011), Lebanon's first female diplomat and esteemed member of the Lebanese delegation to the United Nations.
 Sergei Kourdakov (1951–1973), a former KGB agent and defector from the Soviet Union to Canada

L
 Richard Lawrence (1800–1861), attempted assassin of President Andrew Jackson
 Jane Lawton (1944–2007), Maryland Democratic politician, member of the Maryland House of Delegates
 Blair Lee, III (1916–1985), Democratic politician
 George E. Lemon (?–1896), Patent lawyer and founder the journal National Tribune
 Walter Lenox (1817–1874), mayor of Washington from 1850 to 1852
 John Lenthall (1807–1882),  naval architect and shipbuilder, Chief Constructor of the Navy from 1849 to 1853 and chief of the United States Navys Bureau of Construction and Repair from 1853 to 1871
 Fulton Lewis (1903–1966),  radio and television broadcaster
 Alice Roosevelt Longworth (1884–1980), Republican Party icon, daughter of Theodore Roosevelt
 Anthony Francis Lucas (1855–1921), Croatian-born mechanical engineer

M
 Arthur MacArthur Sr. (1815–1896), 4th Governor of Wisconsin, grandfather of General Douglas MacArthur
 Jackie Martin (1903–1969),  newspaperwoman
 Anna Broom McCeney (1850–1903), Mother of vaudeville performer La Belle Titcomb (Heloise McCeney)
 Hugh McCulloch (1808–1895), Secretary of the Treasury
 George McGovern (1922–2012), Democratic presidential nominee in 1972 and senator from South Dakota
 Dempster McIntosh (1896–1984), ambassador
 Evalyn Walsh McLean (1886–1947), wealthy heiress, one–time owner of the Hope Diamond and the Washington Post
 Washington McLean (1816–1890), businessman, owner of the Cincinnati Enquirer newspaper
 John Gordon Mein (1913–1968), ambassador
 William Rush Merriam, (1849–1931), governor of Minnesota, father of the United States Census Bureau
 Mihran Mesrobian (1889–1975), Armenian-American architect

O
 Carmel Offie (1909–1972), Central Intelligence Agency official

P
 Thomas Nelson Page (1853–1922), First Families of Virginia descendant, attorney, ambassador to Italy, and Southern writer
 Stephan Panaretoff (1853–1931), educator and the first Bulgarian  Minister Plenipotentiary to the United States of America.
 William Paret (1826–1911), sixth Episcopalian Bishop of Maryland
 Rosalie Mackenzie Poe (1810–1874), poet and sister of Edgar Allan Poe
 Terence Powderly (1849–1924), longtime leader of the Knights of Labor
 Robert Prosky (1930–2008), Polish-American actor

R
 John B. Raymond (1844–1886), politician
 Isidor Rayner (1850–1912),  Democratic politician, member of the Senate
 George Washington Riggs (1813–1881),  banker, founder of Riggs Bank
 William A. Rodenberg (1865–1937), politician
 Frederick Rodgers (1842–1917), United States Navy rear admiral
 Tim Russert (1950–2008), journalist, host of Meet the Press

S

 Alexander Robey Shepherd (1835–1902), politician, governor of District of Columbia from 1873 to 1874
 Thetus W. Sims (1852–1939), politician and a member of the United States House of Representatives for the eighth congressional district of Tennessee from 1897 to 1921 
 Upton Sinclair (1878–1968), author, Pulitzer Prize winner
 Ainsworth Rand Spofford (1825–1908), journalist and publisher, sixth Librarian of the United States Congress from 1864 to 1897
 Harlan Fiske Stone (1872–1946), Chief Justice of the United States
 Paulina Longworth Sturm (1925–1957), daughter of Alice Roosevelt and granddaughter of Theodore Roosevelt

T
 Abner Taylor (1829–1903), politician
 George Taylor (1820–1894), attorney and Democratic politician
 Florence Calvert Thorne (1877–1973), labor activist
 Thomas Weston Tipton (1817–1899), U.S. Senator from Nebraska
 Ariadna Tyrkova-Williams (1869–1962), Russian-American writer and journalist

V

 Tran Van Chuong (1898–1986), South Vietnam's Ambassador to the U.S., appointed by Ngo Dinh Diem
 Willis Van Devanter (1859–1941), Associate Justice of the U.S. Supreme Court
 Gore Vidal (1925–2012), author and playwright, next to his companion of 50 years Howard Austen.

W
 Charles Doolittle Walcott (1850–1927), Secretary of the Smithsonian Institution
 Paul Warnke (1920–2001), diplomat, Assistant Secretary of State from 1966 to 1969; SALT Negotiator and Director of the Arms Control and disarmament Agency under President Clinton
 Sumner Welles (1892–1961),  diplomat, Under Secretary of State from 1937 to 1943
 Burton K. Wheeler (1882–1975), Democratic politician and U.S. Senator
 James Alexander Williamson (1829–1902), Union Army general during the American Civil War, Medal of Honor recipient
 Richard L. Wilson (1905–1981), journalist
 William Windom (1827–1891), U.S. Congressman, Senator, Secretary of the Treasury (under Garfield & Harrison)
 Otis Wingo (1877–1930), U.S. representative from Arkansas's 4th congressional district, 1913–1930
 John Vines Wright (1828–1908), U.S. representative from Tennessee, member of the Confederate Congress, judge of the Tennessee Supreme Court

Y
 Helen Yakobson, (1913–2002) academic and professor at George Washington University

See also

 List of cemeteries in the United States

References

External links

 Rock Creek Cemetery History
 Cultural Tourism D.C. – Museums & Historic Places
 
 Map of Rock Creek Cemetery

 
Cemeteries in Washington, D.C.
Anglican cemeteries in the United States
Cemeteries on the National Register of Historic Places in Washington, D.C.
Rock Creek (Potomac River tributary)
Rural cemeteries